Eight women's teams competed in basketball at the 1988 Summer Olympics.

Group A

Australia
The following is the Australia roster in the women's basketball tournament of the 1988 Summer Olympics.

Bulgaria
The following is the Bulgaria roster in the women's basketball tournament of the 1988 Summer Olympics.

South Korea
The following is the South Korea roster in the women's basketball tournament of the 1988 Summer Olympics.

Soviet Union
The following is the Soviet Union roster in the women's basketball tournament of the 1988 Summer Olympics.

Group B

China
The following is the China roster in the women's basketball tournament of the 1988 Summer Olympics.

Czechoslovakia
The following is the Czechoslovakia roster in the women's basketball tournament of the 1988 Summer Olympics.

United States
The following is the United States roster in the women's basketball tournament of the 1988 Summer Olympics.

Yugoslavia
The following is the Yugoslavia roster in the women's basketball tournament of the 1988 Summer Olympics.

References

1988